Cosatto–Marsicano  was an Italian professional cycling team that existed from 1970 to 1971. The team competed in two editions of the Giro d'Italia.

Major wins
1970
 Giro del Belvedere, Flavio Martini

References

Defunct cycling teams based in Italy
1970 establishments in Italy
1971 disestablishments in Italy
Cycling teams established in 1970
Cycling teams disestablished in 1971